The Saint Valentine's Day Massacre was the murder of seven members and associates of Chicago's North Side Gang that occurred on Saint Valentine's Day 1929. The men were gathered at a Lincoln Park, Chicago garage on the morning of February 14, 1929. They were lined up against a wall and shot by four unknown assailants, two dressed as police officers. 

The murders resulted from the competition for control of organized crime in the city during Prohibition between the largely Irish North Siders, headed by George "Bugs" Moran, and their largely Italian Chicago Outfit rivals led by Al Capone. The perpetrators have never been conclusively identified, but former members of the Egan's Rats gang working for Capone are suspected of involvement; others have said that members of the Chicago Police Department who allegedly wanted revenge for the killing of a police officer's son played a part.

The massacre 

At 10:30 in the morning on Saint Valentine's Day, Thursday, February 14, 1929, seven men were murdered at the garage at 2122 North Clark Street, in the Lincoln Park  neighborhood of Chicago's North Side. They were shot by four men using weapons that included two Thompson submachine guns. Two of the shooters were wearing police uniforms, while the others wore suits, ties, overcoats, and hats. Witnesses saw the men in police uniforms leading the other men at gunpoint out of the garage after the shooting.

The victims included five members of George "Bugs" Moran's North Side Gang. Moran's second in command and brother-in-law Albert Kachellek (alias James Clark) was killed along with Adam Heyer, the gang's bookkeeper and business manager; Albert Weinshank, who managed several cleaning and dyeing operations for Moran; and gang enforcers Frank Gusenberg and Peter Gusenberg. Two associates were also shot: Reinhardt H. Schwimmer, a former optician turned gambler and gang associate; and John May, an occasional mechanic for the Moran gang. 

Chicago police officers arrived at the scene to find that victim Frank Gusenberg was still alive, despite having sustained 14 bullet wounds. He was taken to the hospital, where doctors stabilized him for a short time and police tried to question him. When the police asked him who did it, he reportedly replied, "No one shot me." He died three hours later.

The massacre was an attempt to eliminate Bugs Moran, head of the North Side Gang. Al Capone, who was at his Florida home at the time, was widely assumed to have been responsible for ordering the massacre. The impetus for the plan may have been the North Side Gang's hijacking of some expensive whisky being illegally smuggled by Capone's gang from Canada via the Detroit River.

Moran was the last survivor of the North Side gunmen; his succession had come about because his similarly aggressive predecessors, Hymie Weiss and Vincent Drucci, had been killed in the violence that followed the murder of their original leader, Dean O'Banion.

Several factors contributed to the timing of the plan to kill Moran. Moran and Capone had been vying for control of the lucrative Chicago bootlegging trade. Moran had also been muscling in on a Capone-run dog track in the Chicago suburbs, and he had taken over several saloons that were run by Capone, insisting that they were in his territory. Earlier in the year, North Sider Frank Gusenberg and his brother Peter unsuccessfully attempted to murder Jack McGurn. The North Side Gang was complicit in the murders of Pasqualino "Patsy" Lolordo and Antonio "The Scourge" Lombardo. Both had been presidents of the Unione Siciliana, the local Mafia, and close associates of Capone. 

The plan was to lure Moran to the SMC Cartage warehouse on North Clark Street on February 14, 1929, to kill him and perhaps two or three of his lieutenants. It is usually assumed that the North Siders were lured to the garage with the promise of a stolen, cut-rate shipment of whiskey, supplied by Detroit's Purple Gang, which was associated with Capone. The Gusenberg brothers were supposed to drive two empty trucks to Detroit that day to pick up two loads of stolen Canadian whiskey. 

All of the victims were dressed in their best clothes, with the exception of John May, as was customary for the North Siders and other gangsters at the time.
 Most of the Moran gang arrived at the warehouse by approximately 10:30 a.m., but Moran was not there, having left his Parkway Hotel apartment late. He and fellow gang member Ted Newberry were approaching the rear of the warehouse from a side street when they saw a police car nearing the building. They immediately turned and retraced their steps, going to a nearby coffee shop. They encountered gang member Henry Gusenberg on the street and warned him, so he too turned back. North Side Gang member Willie Marks also spotted the police car on his way to the garage and ducked into a doorway and jotted down the license number before leaving the neighborhood.

Capone's lookouts likely mistook one of Moran's men, probably Albert Weinshank, who was the same height and build, for Moran himself. The physical similarity between the two men was enhanced by their dress that morning; both happened to be wearing the same color overcoats and hats. 

Witnesses outside the garage saw a Cadillac sedan pull up to a stop in front of the garage. Four men emerged and walked inside, two of them dressed in police uniform. The two fake police officers carried shotguns and entered the rear portion of the garage, where they found members of Moran's gang and associates Reinhart Schwimmer and John May, who was fixing one of the trucks. The fake policemen then ordered the men to line up against the wall, then signaled to the pair in civilian clothes who had accompanied them. Two of the killers opened fire with Thompson sub-machine guns, one with a 20-round box magazine and the other a 50-round drum. They were thorough, spraying their victims left and right, even continuing to fire after all seven had hit the floor.  Two shotgun blasts afterward all but obliterated the faces of John May and James Clark, according to the coroner's report.

To give the appearance that everything was under control, the men in street clothes came out with their hands up, prodded by the two uniformed policemen. Inside the garage, the only survivors in the warehouse were May's dog "Highball" and Frank Gusenberg, despite 14 bullet wounds. He was still conscious, but he died three hours later, refusing to identify the killers.

Victims 
 Peter Gusenberg, a front-line enforcer for the Moran organizations
 Frank Gusenberg, the brother of Peter Gusenberg and also an enforcer
 Albert Kachellek (alias "James Clark"), Moran's second in command
 Adam Heyer, the bookkeeper and business manager of the Moran gang
 Reinhardt Schwimmer, an optometrist who had abandoned his practice to gamble on horse racing and associate with the gang
 Albert Weinshank, who managed several cleaning and dyeing operations for Moran; his resemblance to Moran is allegedly what set the massacre in motion before Moran arrived, including the clothes that he was wearing
 John May, an occasional car mechanic for the Moran gang

Investigation 
The Valentine's Day Massacre set off a public outcry which posed a problem for all mob bosses. Within days, Capone received a summons to testify before a Chicago grand jury on charges of federal Prohibition violations, but he said he was too unwell to attend.

It was common knowledge that Moran was hijacking Capone's Detroit-based liquor shipments, and police focused their attention on Detroit's predominantly Jewish Purple Gang. Landladies Mrs. Doody and Mrs. Orvidson had taken in three men as roomers ten days before the massacre, and their rooming houses were directly across the street from the North Clark Street garage. They picked out mugshots of Purple Gang members George Lewis, Eddie Fletcher, Phil Keywell, and his younger brother Harry, but they later wavered in their identification. The police questioned and cleared Fletcher, Lewis, and Harry Keywell. Nevertheless, the Keywell brothers (and by extension the Purple Gang) remained associated with the crime in the years that followed. Many also believed that the police were involved, which may have been the intention of the killers.

On February 22, police were called to the scene of a garage fire on Wood Street where they found a 1927 Cadillac sedan disassembled and partially burned, and determined that the killers had used the car. They traced the engine number to a Michigan Avenue dealer who had sold the car to a James Morton of Los Angeles. The garage had been rented by a man calling himself Frank Rogers, who gave his address as 1859 West North Avenue. This was the address of the Circus Café operated by Claude Maddox, a former St. Louis gangster with ties to the Capone gang, the Purple Gang, and the St. Louis gang, Egan's Rats. 

Police could not turn up any information about persons named James Morton or Frank Rogers, but they had a definite lead on one of the killers. Just minutes before the killings, a truck driver named Elmer Lewis had turned a corner a block away from 2122 North Clark and sideswiped a police car. He told police that he stopped immediately but was waved away by the uniformed driver, who was missing a front tooth. Board of Education President H. Wallace Caldwell had witnessed the accident, and he gave the same description of the driver. Police were confident that they were describing Fred Burke, a former member of Egan's Rats. Burke and a close companion named James Ray were known to wear police uniforms whenever on a robbery spree. Burke was also a fugitive, under indictment for robbery and murder in Ohio. Police also suggested that Joseph Lolordo could have been one of the killers because of his brother Pasqualino's recent murder by the North Side Gang.

Police then announced that they suspected Capone gunmen John Scalise and Albert Anselmi, as well as Jack McGurn and Frank Rio, a Capone bodyguard. Police eventually charged McGurn and Scalise with the massacre. Capone murdered Scalise, Anselmi, and Joseph "Hop Toad" Giunta in May 1929 after he learned about their plan to kill him. The police dropped the murder charges against Jack McGurn because of a lack of evidence, and he was just charged with a violation of the Mann Act; he took his girlfriend Louise Rolfe across state lines to marry.

The case stagnated until December 14, 1929, when the Berrien County, Michigan Sheriff's Department raided the St. Joseph, Michigan bungalow of "Frederick Dane", the registered owner of a vehicle driven by Fred "Killer" Burke. Burke had been drinking that night, then rear-ended another vehicle and drove off. Patrolman Charles Skelly pursued, finally forcing him off the road. Skelly hopped onto the running board of Burke's car, but he was shot three times and died of his wounds that night. The car was found wrecked and abandoned just outside St. Joseph and traced to Fred Dane. By this time, police photos confirmed that Dane was in fact Fred Burke, wanted by the Chicago police for his participation in the St. Valentine's Day Massacre.

Police raided Burke's bungalow and found a large trunk containing a bullet-proof vest, almost $320,000 in bonds recently stolen from a Wisconsin bank, two Thompson submachine guns, pistols, two shotguns, and thousands of rounds of ammunition. St. Joseph authorities immediately notified the Chicago police, who requested both machine guns. They used the new science of forensic ballistics to identify both weapons as those used in the massacre. They also discovered that one of them had also been used to murder New York mobster Frankie Yale a year and a half earlier. Unfortunately, no further concrete evidence surfaced in the massacre case. 

Burke was captured over a year later on a Missouri farm. The case against him was strongest in connection to the murder of Officer Skelly, so he was tried in Michigan and subsequently sentenced to life imprisonment. He died in prison in 1940.

Bolton revelations 
On January 8, 1935, FBI agents surrounded a Chicago apartment building at 3920 North Pine Grove looking for the remaining members of the Barker Gang. A brief shootout erupted, resulting in the death of bank robber Russell Gibson. Taken into custody were Doc Barker, Byron Bolton, and two women. Bolton was a Navy machine-gunner and associate of Egan's Rats, and he had been the valet of Chicago hit man Fred Goetz. Bolton was privy to many of the Barker Gang's crimes and pinpointed the Florida hideout of Ma Barker and Freddie Barker, both of whom were killed in a shootout with the FBI a week later. Bolton said he took part in the St. Valentine's Day Massacre with Goetz, Fred Burke, and several others.

The FBI had no jurisdiction in a state murder case, so they kept Bolton's revelations confidential until the Chicago American newspaper reported a second-hand version of his confession. The newspaper declared that the crime had been "solved", despite being stonewalled by J. Edgar Hoover and the FBI, who did not want any part of the massacre case. Garbled versions of Bolton's story went out in the national media. Bolton, it was reported, said that the plan to murder Bugs Moran had been plotted in October or November 1928 at a Couderay, Wisconsin resort owned by Fred Goetz. Present at this meeting were Goetz, Al Capone, Frank Nitti, Fred Burke, Gus Winkler, Louis Campagna, Daniel Serritella, William Pacelli, and Bolton. The men stayed two or three weeks, hunting and fishing when they were not planning the murder of their enemies.

Bolton said that he and Jimmy Moran were charged with watching the S.M.C. Cartage garage and phoning the signal to the killers at the Circus Café when Bugs Moran arrived at the meeting. Police had found a letter addressed to Bolton in the lookout nest (and possibly a vial of prescription medicine). Bolton guessed that the actual killers had been Burke, Winkeler, Goetz, Bob Carey, Raymond "Crane Neck" Nugent, and Claude Maddox (four shooters and two getaway drivers). Bolton gave an account of the massacre different from the one generally told by historians. He said that he saw only "plainclothes" men exit the Cadillac and go into the garage. This indicates that a second car was used by the killers. George Brichet said he saw at least two uniformed men exiting a car in the alley and entering the garage through its rear doors. A Peerless Motor Company sedan had been found near a Maywood house owned by Claude Maddox in the days after the massacre, and in one of the pockets was an address book belonging to victim Albert Weinshank. Bolton said that he had mistaken one of Moran's men to be Moran, after which he telephoned the signal to the Circus Café. The killers had expected to kill Moran and two or three of his men, but they were unexpectedly confronted with seven men; they simply decided to kill them all and get out fast. Bolton said that Capone was furious with him for his mistake and the resulting police pressure and threatened to kill him, only to be dissuaded by Fred Goetz.

His claims were corroborated by Gus Winkeler's widow Georgette in an official FBI statement and in her memoirs, which were published in a four-part series in a true detective magazine during the winter of 1935–36. She revealed that her husband and his friends had formed a special crew used by Capone for high-risk jobs. The mob boss was said to have trusted them implicitly and nicknamed them the "American Boys". Bolton's statements were also backed up by William Drury, a Chicago detective who had stayed on the massacre case long after everyone else had given up. Bank robber Alvin Karpis later said to have heard secondhand from Ray Nugent about the massacre and that the "American Boys" were paid a collective salary of $2,000 a week plus bonuses. Karpis also said that Capone had told him while they were in Alcatraz together that Goetz had been the actual planner of the massacre.

Despite Byron Bolton's statements, no action was taken by the FBI. All the men whom he named were dead by 1935, with the exception of Burke and Maddox. Bank robber Harvey Bailey complained in his 1973 autobiography that he and Fred Burke had been drinking beer in Calumet City, Illinois at the time of the massacre, and the resulting heat forced them to abandon their bank robbing ventures. Historians are still divided on whether or not the "American Boys" committed the St. Valentine's Day Massacre.

Other suspects 
Many mobsters have been named as part of the Valentine's Day hit team. Two prime suspects are Cosa Nostra hit men John Scalise and Albert Anselmi. In the days after the massacre, Scalise was heard to brag, "I am the most powerful man in Chicago." Unione Siciliana president Joseph Guinta had recently elevated him to the position of the Unione's vice-president. Nevertheless, Scalise, Anselmi, and Guinta were found dead on a lonely road near Hammond, Indiana on May 8, 1929. Gangland lore has it that Capone had discovered that the pair were planning to betray him. Legend states that Capone produced a baseball bat at the climax of a dinner party thrown in their honor and beat the trio to death.

In 1995 Chicago criminologist Arthur Bilek, who had researched the massacre through FBI files and court transcripts for 30 years, named the participants in the massacre to have been "Capone henchmen "Machine Gun" Jack McGurn, who assembled the murder team that included lookouts Byron Bolton, Jimmy Moran (no relation to Bugs) and Jimmy McCryssen. Their job was to watch the garage and alert Tony Accardo and the other triggermen - Fred Burke, Gus Winkler, Freddie Goetz and Robert Carey - when Bugs Moran appeared at the site. Another team member, according to Bilek, was Claude "Screwy" Maddox, who procured the killers' transportation - a car resembling those used by police. With the stage set, Capone and McGurn established alibis: Capone going to Florida; McGurn checked into a hotel with his wife, Louise Rolfe." His claims were backed up by the former FBI agent William Roemer, who had heard claims of Tony Accardo also being involved as one of the shooters on several occasions by Murray "The Camel" Humphreys through a microphone planted in the Chicago Tailor shop in 1959.

Murder weapons 
Police tested the two Thompson submachine guns (serial numbers 2347 and 7580) found in Fred Burke's Michigan bungalow and determined that both had been used in the massacre. One of them had also been used in the murder of Brooklyn mob boss Frankie Yale, which confirmed the New York Police Department's long-held theory that Burke had been responsible for Yale's death.

Les Farmer, a deputy sheriff in Marion, Illinois purchased gun number 2347 on November 12, 1924. Marion and the surrounding area were overrun by the warring bootleg factions of the Shelton Brothers Gang and Charlie Birger. Farmer had ties with Egan's Rats, based 100 miles away in St. Louis, and the weapon had wound up in Fred Burke's possession by 1927. It is possible that he used this same gun in Detroit's Milaflores Massacre on March 28, 1927. Chicago sporting goods owner Peter von Frantzius sold gun number 7580 to a Victor Thompson, also known as Frank V. Thompson, but it wound up with James "Bozo" Shupe, a small-time hood from Chicago's West Side who had ties to various members of Capone's outfit. Both guns are currently in the possession of the Berrien County, Michigan Sheriff's Department.

Legacy

Crime scene and bricks from the murder wall 

The garage at 2122 N. Clark Street was demolished in 1967, and the site is now a parking lot for a nursing home. The bricks of the north wall against which the victims were shot were purchased by a Canadian businessman. For many years, they were displayed in various crime-related novelty displays. Many of them were later sold individually, and the remainder are now owned by the Mob Museum in Las Vegas.

In popular culture
The Saint Valentine's Day Massacre has been portrayed, referenced, or emulated in the following works:

Biographical
 Al Capone, a 1959 film directed by Richard Wilson starring Rod Steiger as Capone
 Seven Against the Wall, a 1959 episode of Playhouse 90 directed by Franklin J. Schaffner starring Paul Lambert as Capone
 The St. Valentine's Day Massacre, a 1967 film directed by Roger Corman starring Jason Robards as Capone
 Capone, a 1975 film directed by Steve Carver starring Ben Gazzara as Capone
 The Untouchables, a 1987 film directed by Brian De Palma that briefly mentions the massacre
 The Making of the Mob: Chicago, a 2016 miniseries about Al Capone that reenacts the massacre's scene
 Gangster Land, a 2017 film about Al Capone

Fictional
 Scarface, a 1932 gangster film directed by Howard Hawks that is loosely based on the life of Al Capone and depicts a version of the Saint Valentine's Day Massacre
 Some Like It Hot, a 1959 comedy directed by Billy Wilder in which Tony Curtis and Jack Lemmon play characters on the run after witnessing the Saint Valentine's Day Massacre
 Oscar, a comedy film directed by John Landis in which Sylvester Stallone's character is implied to have been at the massacre.
In The Rocketeer (1991) Neville Sinclair gives gangster boss Eddie Valentine an ironic "Happy Valentine's Day" greeting as a reference to both Eddie's name and his impending execution by Nazi commandos.
 Mafia 3, although mentioned only in a newspaper, Sal Marcano and his brothers slaughtered their former boss and his men. This event is referred to as the "All Saints Day Massacre".

Other
 St. Valentine's Day Massacre: In Your House, produced by the World Wrestling Federation (WWF; WWE as of 2002); a pay-per-view (PPV) professional wrestling event. It took place on February 14, 1999, at the Memphis Pyramid in Memphis, Tennessee.  The title of the event alludes to the Saint Valentine's Day massacre.

See also 
 Gun politics in the United States
 List of events named massacres
 List of massacres in Illinois
 List of unsolved murders
 National Firearms Act

References

Further reading 
 Braucher, Scott (March 19, 2012). "Life Member Dan Tortorell, 95, Was At St. Valentine's Day Massacre". National Press Photographers Association.
 Chicago Shimpo – The Chicago Japanese American News, Friday, October 10, 2008. Volume 6732, p. 7. .
 Helmer, William and Arthur J. Bilek. The St. Valentine's Day Massacre: The Untold Story of the Bloodbath That Brought Down Al Capone. Nashville: Cumberland House, 2004. .

External links 
 The True Story of the St. Valentine's Day Massacre, excerpted from Get Capone, by biographer Jonathan Eig (Chicago magazine)
 Haunted Chicago 
 Mystery.net
 Mario Gomes Capone Museum
 MisterCapone.com. Official Site of Mr. Capone author, Robert J. Schoenberg
 ABC 7 Chicago shoots down massacre theory from the book "Get Capone" 

1929 in Illinois
1929 mass shootings in the United States
1929 murders in the United States
1920s in Chicago
20th-century mass murder in the United States
American Mafia events
Chicago Outfit
Crimes in Chicago
Deaths by firearm in Illinois
February 1929 events in the United States
Irish-American organized crime events
Mass murder in 1929
Massacres in 1929
Massacres in the United States
Mass shootings in Illinois
Mass shootings in the United States
Murder in Chicago
Organized crime conflicts in the United States
Organized crime history of Chicago
Prohibition in the United States
The Purple Gang
Unsolved mass murders in the United States
Violent non-state actor incidents in the United States